The Upper Agno River Basin Resource Reserve is a protected area located on the southeast flank of the Cordillera Central in the Philippine province of Benguet along its border with Ifugao and Nueva Vizcaya. It is a resource reserve located high in the Central and Polis ranges protecting the headwaters of the Agno River. According to section 4 of the National Integrated Protected Areas System Act (R.A. 7586), a resource reserve is an extensive and relatively isolated area designated as such to preserve the natural resources of the area.
The reserve comprises  of the catchment area that feeds the Ambuklao and Binga dams, two of the country's oldest hydroelectric plants that supply power to the city of Baguio and entire Benguet province. Upper Agno is north of and contiguous with the Lower Agno Watershed Forest Reserve that preserves the immediate downstream of the Binga Dam where the Agno River is impounded by a third dam, the San Roque Dam, the largest in the Philippines and the main source of water, electric energy and irrigation for surrounding regions in Luzon.

History
The area of the Upper Agno river basin first achieved official park protection on February 16, 1929, when Governor-General Henry L. Stimson signed Proclamation No. 217 declaring 81.8% of the entire Cordillera Central range as the Central Cordillera Forest Reserve. Through an amendment to the law made in 1932 by Governor-General Theodore Roosevelt Jr., the reserve lost  of fragmented lands to mining concessions. When President Manuel L. Quezon signed Proclamation No. 65 in 1936, a portion of the basin surrounding Mount Data was re-gazetted as part of the  Baguio–Bontoc Scenic National Park.

In 1946, the Agno River Development Program was launched to construct six hydropower facilities along the Agno River. The Ambuklao Dam was built in 1956 while the second facility, the Binga Dam, was completed in 1960. On November 25, 1966, President Ferdinand Marcos issued Proclamation No. 120 declaring the immediate upstream and downstream of the Ambuklao Dam including a portion of the Mount Data National Park traversed by the Agno River as part of a new protected area, the  Ambuklao Watershed Forest Reserve. In 1987, a portion of the forest reserve containing Luzon's highest peak, Mount Pulag, Mount Tabeyoc, Mount Panotoan and four other adjacent peaks were set aside as the Mount Pulag National Park.

Geography

The Upper Agno reserve protects the northernmost  section of the Agno River from the Mount Data National Park in Buguias to Binga Dam in Itogon. It is located to the east and north of the city of Baguio in the southern Cordillera Central mountains and covers the catchment area between the ridges of the Central and Polis ranges. The majority of the reserve is in Benguet shared by the municipalities of Atok, Bokod, Buguias, Itogon, Kabayan, Kibungan, La Trinidad and Tublay. It also has a sizeable area in Ifugao split between the towns of Hungduan and Kiangan and a small part in Nueva Vizcaya in the town of Kayapa.

The Upper Agno River Basin is the third largest sub-catchment in the entire Agno River Basin that spans three regions in northern Luzon. The reserve is also fed by several other smaller streams including Karao River in Bokod, and Eddet and Adaoay rivers in Kabayan.

Upper Agno is one of the highest protected areas in the country. Mount Mongawto (Mongoto) is the highest point in the reserve at  situated in the Central range within the municipality of Atok. Halsema Highway (Baguio–Bontoc Road), the country's highest paved national road, runs through the reserve's western boundaries. This area experiences regular hailstorms and some of the coolest weather in the Philippines.

The focal point of the reserve is the Ambuklao Dam and reservoir situated on the confluence of the Agno and Bokod rivers in the southern portion of the reserve. It is the oldest hydropower dam in the country built in 1956 with a reservoir capacity of  that supplied 75 megawatts (increased to 105 MW when it was rehabilitated in 2011) to the Luzon grid.

Ecology

The ecology of the Upper Agno reserve varies from lower montane forests, upper montane forests to grassland summits. The most dominant vegetation in the lower montane forests are the Benguet pine (Pinus kesiya), evergreen shrubs (Gaultheria borneensis) and makole flowering plants (Coprosma granadensis). In slopes above , the mossy forests primarily contain woody plants belonging to the Ericaceae family such as Rhododendron taxifolium, Rhododendron subsessile, Vaccinium myrtoides and Vaccinium indutum. Above the upper montane forests that cover the summits of the highest peaks are grasslands dominated by dwarf bamboo (Yushania niitikayamensis) as well as heathgrass (Danthonia oreoboloides), reedgrass (Deyeuxia suizanensis), Pulag St. Johnswort (Hypericum pulogense) and (Trichophorum subcapitatum). An endemic ornamental begonia, Begonia merrittii, is also known to occur in high elevation habitats of Upper Agno.

At least 70 bird species have been sighted or recorded within the protected area, 46 of which are endemic to the Philippines, including the scale-feathered malkoha, mountain shrike, indigo-banded kingfisher, bicolored flowerpecker, balicassiao, flame-breasted fruit dove, Philippine coucal, Philippine scops owl, white-browed jungle flycatcher, blue-headed fantail, lovely sunbird, Luzon striped babbler, Northern Luzon dark-throated oriole and whiskered pitta. Its mammalian wildlife species include the Asian palm civet, Malayan civet, Philippine long-tailed macaque, Northern Luzon giant cloud rat, Mount Data shrew-rat, Luzon shrew, large flying fox, Philippine warty pig and Philippine deer.

The Upper Agno river and its tributaries have the highest fish diversity among the five river systems in Benguet.
Fish species found in these rivers include Java fat-nose goby, mangrove flathead goby, giant mottled eel, pond loach and mosquitofish. The Ambuklao reservoir is stocked abundantly with introduced fish species, namely silver perch, Celebes goby, common carp, silver carp, bighead carp and tilapia. It also has commercially abundant freshwater shrimp and Asiatic clam. The Ambuklao reservoir also supports aquaculture and has at least 83 fish cage operators harvesting crimson snapper, tilapia and silver carp within the permitted  fishing zone of the more than  artificial lake since 1994.

Recreation

Nestled between Mount Pulag and Mount Ugo just east of the Ambuklao lake in Bokod is an ecologically significant hiking mountain circuit destination with peaks rising above .

Gallery

References

Forest reserves of the Philippines
Geography of Benguet
Geography of Ifugao
Geography of Nueva Vizcaya
Tourist attractions in Benguet
Birdwatching sites in the Philippines
Protected areas established in 1966
Protected areas established in 2000
1966 establishments in the Philippines
2000 establishments in the Philippines